The Maskeliya Dam (also known as the Maussakelle Dam) is a large gravity dam at Maskeliya, in the Central Province of Sri Lanka. Along with the Castlereigh Dam, the dams are the highest point and beginning of the Laxapana Hydropower Complex, involving a number of dams, penstocks, and hydroelectric power stations. The dam creates the Maskeliya Reservoir over the route of Maskeliya Oya, a major tributary of the Kelani River, which is the 4th longest in the country.

Power station 
Water from the Canyon Power Station is discharged into the Canyon Reservoir, located at the same site.

See also 
 List of dams and reservoirs in Sri Lanka
 List of power stations in Sri Lanka

References 

1983 establishments in Sri Lanka
Buildings and structures in Nuwara Eliya District
Dams completed in 1983
Dams in Sri Lanka
Gravity dams
Hydroelectric power stations in Sri Lanka